Elizabeth Carling (born 20 October 1967 in Middlesbrough) is an English actress and singer best known for her performances in Boon, Goodnight Sweetheart, Barbara, and Casualty. In 1991 Carling was briefly engaged to Neil Morrissey, whom she met while working on the ITV drama Boon and with whom she also appeared in an episode of BBC sitcom Men Behaving Badly.

As of February 2010, she starred in the theatre production of I Ought to Be in Pictures. In 2016, she narrated the second series of Bear Grylls: Mission Survive on ITV. Carling also appeared on "Our Girl" on BBC1 on 7 September 2016.

Film & television roles
Our Girl 7 Sep 2016 - 2020 
Vera (15 May 2011) (30 Jan 2018)
The Damned United: (UK sports drama film, released 2009) as Barbara Clough, playing the role of the wife of Brian Clough (played by Michael Sheen) in a film focusing on events from 1967 to 1974 when Brian Clough was manager of Derby County and finally with his ill-fated 44 days in charge of Leeds United.
Casualty:  (2003, 2004-2007) In March 2003 she joined the cast of Casualty for a six-week run playing consultant neurologist Selena Donovan. The character was brought back in 2004 at the start of the show’s nineteenth season. Carling remained in the role for three full years, departing at the end of the twenty first season in 2007 when her character was killed off in a dramatic shooting.
Goodnight Sweetheart: In 1997–99, she took over the role of Phoebe Bamford (later to become Phoebe Sparrow) in the last three series of the time travel sitcom Goodnight Sweetheart. The part was originally played by Dervla Kirwan. After the series, she released an album of war-time covers also titled Goodnight Sweetheart. Phoebe Sparrow is one of her favourite roles. It returned for a special edition in 2016 with Carling reprising the role of Phoebe.
 Border Cafe: TV mini-series in 2000 with Sean Gallagher.
Barbara: as Linda, the daughter of the eponymous matriarch in the ITV sitcom Barbara. She appeared in 24 of the series' 29 episodes, from 1999–2003, playing opposite her on-screen husband, Martin Pond (Mark Benton).
Crocodile Shoes II: as Wendy, the fiancée of Jed Shepperd. She appeared in all six episodes of the six part series (screened on BBC One in 1996).
Boon: as Laura Marsh, assistant to Ken Boon, in the ITV private investigator series Boon. She appeared in 40 episodes of Series 4, 5 and 6, from 1989–91. This was her first major TV role.
The Bill: as Miss White, the hotel receptionist, in the 1987 episode "Overnight Stay" and Maria Saunders in 1992 episode "Users".
Bear Grylls: Mission Survive as Narrator, series 2 onwards

Radio roles

She starred as Lucy in Radio 4's Double Income, No Kids Yet, which was written by David Spicer and also stars David Tennant, Meera Syal and Tony Gardner. The series was originally broadcast in 2001.

References

External links

http://www.holby.tv/db/index.php?id=38,211,0,0,1,0
http://www.martinunderwood.f9.co.uk/Boon/

1967 births
English radio actresses
English television actresses
Living people
Actors from Middlesbrough
Actors from Yorkshire